Land reform is a form of agrarian reform involving the changing of laws, regulations, or customs regarding land ownership. Land reform may consist of a government-initiated or government-backed property redistribution, generally of agricultural land. Land reform can, therefore, refer to transfer of ownership from the more powerful to the less powerful, such as from a relatively small number of wealthy or noble owners with extensive land holdings (e.g., plantations, large ranches, or agribusiness plots) to individual ownership by those who work the land. Such transfers of ownership may be with or without compensation; compensation may vary from token amounts to the full value of the land.

Land reform may also entail the transfer of land from individual ownership—even peasant ownership in smallholdings—to government-owned collective farms; it has also, in other times and places, referred to the exact opposite: division of government-owned collective farms into smallholdings. The common characteristic of all land reforms, however, is modification or replacement of existing institutional arrangements governing possession and use of land. Thus, while land reform may be radical in nature, such as through large-scale transfers of land from one group to another, it can also be less dramatic, such as regulatory reforms aimed at improving land administration.

Nonetheless, any revision or reform of a country's land laws can still be an intensely political process, as reforming land policies serves to change relationships within and between communities, as well as between communities and the state. Thus even small-scale land reforms and legal modifications may be subject to intense debate or conflict.

Land usage and tenure 

Land ownership and tenure can be perceived as controversial in part because ideas defining what it means to access or control land, such as through "land ownership" or "land tenure", can vary considerably across regions and even within countries. Land reforms, which change what it means to control land, therefore create tensions and conflicts between those who lose and those who gain from these redefinitions (see next section).

Western conceptions of land have evolved over the past several centuries to place greater emphasis on individual land ownership, formalized through documents such as land titles. Control over land, however, may also be perceived less in terms of individual ownership and more in terms of land use, or through what is known as land tenure. Historically, in many parts of Africa for example, land was not owned by an individual, but rather used by an extended family or a village community. Different people in a family or community had different rights to access this land for different purposes and at different times. Such rights were often conveyed through oral history and not formally documented.

These different ideas of land ownership and tenure are sometimes referred to using different terminology. For example, "formal" or "statutory" land systems refer to ideas of land control more closely affiliated with individual land ownership. "Informal" or "customary" land systems refer to ideas of land control more closely affiliated with land tenure.

Terms dictating control over and use of land can therefore take many forms. Some specific examples of present-day or historic forms of formal and informal land ownership include:
 Traditional land tenure, as practiced by the indigenous tribes of Pre-Columbian North America.
 Feudal land ownership, through fiefdoms
 Life estate, interest in real property that ends at death.
 Fee tail, hereditary, non-transferable ownership of real property.
 Fee simple. Under common law, this is the most complete ownership interest one can have in real property.
 Leasehold or rental
 Rights to use a common
 Sharecropping
Run rig and rundale
Well-Field System
 Easements
Kibbutz and moshav
Satoyama
 Agricultural labor – under which someone works the land in exchange for money, payment in kind, or some combination of the two
 Collective ownership
 Access to land through a membership in a cooperative, or shares in a corporation, which owns the land (typically by fee simple or its equivalent, but possibly under other arrangements).
 Government collectives, such as those that might be found in communist states, whereby government ownership of most agricultural land is combined in various ways with tenure for farming collectives.

Motivation

Land reform is a deeply political process and therefore many arguments for and against it have emerged. These arguments vary tremendously over time and place. In the twentieth century, many land reforms emerged from a particular political ideology, such as communism or socialism. In the 19th century in colonized states, a colonial government may have changed the laws dictating land ownership to better consolidate political power or to support its colonial economy. In more recent times, electoral mobilization and the use of land as a patronage resource have been proposed as possible motivations for land reform efforts, such as the extensive redistributive land reforms of Robert Mugabe in Zimbabwe.

Arguments for

Arguments in support of land reform focus on its potential social and economic benefits, particularly in developing countries, that may emerge from reforms focused on greater land formalization. Such benefits may include eradicating food insecurity and alleviating rural poverty.

Arguments in support of such reforms gained particular momentum after the publication of The Mystery of Capital: Why Capitalism Triumphs in the West and Fails Everywhere Else by Peruvian economist Hernando de Soto in 2000. The poor, he argues, are often unable to secure formal property rights, such as land titles, to the land on which they live or farm because of poor governance, corruption and/or overly complex bureaucracies. Without land titles or other formal documentation of their land assets, they are less able to access formal credit. Political and legal reforms within countries, according to de Soto, will help to include the poor in formal legal and economic systems, increase the poor's ability to access credit and contribute to economic growth and poverty reduction.

Many international development organizations and bilateral and multilateral donors, such as the World Bank, have embraced de Soto's ideas, or similar ideas, about the benefits of greater formalized land rights. This has translated into a number of development programs that work with governments and civil society organizations to initiate and implement land reforms. Evidence to support the economic and pro-poor benefits of increased formalized land rights are, however, still inconclusive according to some critics (see "Arguments against land reform" below).

Other arguments in support of land reform point to the need to alleviate conflicting land laws, particularly in former colonies, where formal and informal land systems may exist in tension with each other. Such conflicts can make marginalized groups vulnerable to further exploitation. For example, in many countries in Africa with conflicting land laws, AIDS stigmatization has led to an increasing number of AIDS widows being kicked off marital land by in-laws. While the woman may have both customary and statutory rights to the land, confusion over which set of laws has primacy, or even a lack of knowledge of relevant laws, leave many AIDS widows at a significant disadvantage. Also, conflicting formal and informal land laws can also clog a country's legal system, making it prone to corruption.

Additional arguments for land reform focus on the potential environmental benefits of reform. For example, if reform leads to greater security of land ownership, through either formal or informal means, then those that use the land will be better stewards of it.

Land reforms carried out in Japan, Taiwan and South Korea are credited  with contributing to the industrial development. The equitable distribution of land led to increasing agricultural outputs, high rural purchasing power and social mobility.

Arguments against
Many of the arguments in support of land reform speak to its potentially positive social and economic outcomes. Yet, as mentioned previously, land reform is an intensely political process. Thus, many of those opposed to land reform are nervous as to the underlying motivations of those initiating the reform. For example, some may fear that they will be disadvantaged or victimized as a result of the reforms. Others may fear that they will lose out in the economic and political power struggles that underlie many land reforms.

Other groups and individuals express concerns about land reforms focused on formalization of property rights. While the economic and social benefits of formalized land rights are often touted, some research suggests that such reforms are either ineffective or may cause further hardship or conflict.

Additional arguments against land reform focus on concerns over equity issues and potential elite capture of land, particularly in regards to reforms focused on greater land formalization. If improperly or inadequately implemented, critics worry that such reforms may further disadvantage marginalized groups such as indigenous communities or women. These concerns also lead to questions about the institutional capacity of governments to implement land reforms as they are designed. Even if a country does have this capacity, critics worry that corruption and patrimonialism will lead to further elite capture.

In looking at more radical reforms, such as large-scale land redistribution, arguments against reform include concerns that redistributed land will not be used productively and that owners of expropriated land will not be compensated adequately or compensated at all. Zimbabwe, again, is a commonly cited example of the perils of such large-scale reforms, whereby land redistribution contributed to economic decline and increased food insecurity in the country. In cases where land reform has been enacted as part of socialist collectivization, many of the arguments against collectivization more generally apply.

National efforts

An early example of land reform was the Irish Land Acts of 1870–1909. Most all newly independent countries of Eastern and Central Europe implemented land reforms in the aftermath of World War I. In most countries, the land in excess of certain limits (depending on the region and type of land) was expropriated; in Finland, it was redeemed and placed into a special fund.

See also

 Adverse possession
 Agrarian Justice
 Agrarian reform
 Certificate of occupancy
 Chinese Land Reform
 Citizen's Dividend
 Concentration of land ownership
 Classical rent
 Collectivization in the Soviet Union
 Common land
 Dekulakization
 Differential and absolute ground rent
 Eminent domain
 Enclosure
 Freiwirtschaft
 Frente Unido de Reforma Agraria
 Gentrification
 Georgism
 Homestead principle
 Land (economics)
 Land Acts (Ireland)
 Land banking
 Land claim
 Land consumption
 Land grabbing
 Land law
 Landlessness
 Land consolidation
 Land Reform in Developing Countries
 Land reforms by country
 Land tenure
 Land titling
 Land value tax
 Manorialism
 México Indígena
 Mutualism
 Natural capital
 Nonpossessory interest in land
 Profit (real property)
 Real estate appraisal
 Restitution
 Serfdom
 Settler
 Speculation
 Squatting
 Stolypin reform
 Usufruct
 Water scarcity
 Zapatismo

References

Further reading 
 
 Caralee McLiesh and Richard E. Messick, Moderators. (2004). "Can Formal Property Titling Programs Ensure Increased Business Investments and Growth?". World Bank.
 Ciparisse, Gérard. (2003). Multilingual Thesaurus on Land Tenure. Food and Agriculture Organization (FAO) of the UN. .
 Cahill, Kevin. "Who Owns The World: The Hidden Facts Behind Landownership", Mainstream Publishing, 2006, . .
 Cahill, Kevin. "Who Owns Britain: The Hidden Facts Behind Landownership in the UK and Ireland", Canongate Books, 2002. . .
 Michael Lipton, Land Reform in Developing Countries: Property rights and property wrongs, Routledge, 2009
 R. H. Tawney, Land and Labour in China New York, Harcourt Brace & Company (1979). 3rd Edition. . .
 Fu Chen, Liming Wang and John Davis, "Land reform in rural China since the mid-1980s", Land Reform 1998/2, a publication of the Sustainable Development Department of the United Nations' Food and Agriculture Organization (FAO).
 William H. Hinton. Fanshen: A Documentary of Revolution in a Chinese Village. New York: Monthly Review Press, 1966. . .
 Ho, Peter. (2001, June). Who Owns China's Land? Policies, Property Rights and Deliberate Institutional Ambiguity, The China Quarterly, Vol. 166, June 2001, pp. 387–414
 Ho, Peter. (2006). "Institutions In Transition: Land Ownership, Property Rights and Social Conflict in China. Oxford and New York: Oxford University Press. . .
 Mark Moyar. "Villager attitudes during the final decade of the Vietnam War". Presented at 1996 Vietnam Symposium "After the Cold War: Reassessing Vietnam".
 Summary of "Efficiency and wellbeing for 80 years" by Tarmo Luoma on site of TEHO magazine.
 Rudzani Albert Makhado and Kgabo Lawrance Masehela. (2012). Perspectives on South Africa's Land Reform Debate. Lambert Academic Publishing, Germany. . .
 Henry George, "Progress and Poverty: An inquiry into the cause of industrial depressions and of increase of want with increase of wealth: the remedy", 1879.
 Groppo, Paolo. (1998). Land Reform: Land Settlement and Cooperatives Bulletin. Food and Agriculture Organization (FAO) of the UN.
 Krogh, Peter Frederic. (1986). U.S. and Third World Land Reform. American Interests. Dean Peter Krogh Foreign Affairs Digital Archives. School of Foreign Service, Georgetown University.
 Goodman, Amy. (2010). Global Food Security and Sovereignty Threatened by Corporate and Government “Land Grabs” in Poor Countries. Democracy Now!''.
 Wallace, Alfred Russel. (1882). Land Nationalisation: Its necessity and its aims: Being a comparison of the system of landlord and tenant with that of occupying ownership in their influence on the well-being of the people.

External links

 Land Research Action Network: News, Analysis, and Research on Land Reform.
 Land, Territory and Dignity Forum
 Landesa - Securing land rights for the world's poorest.

 
Land administration
Marxist theory
Agricultural policy
Decolonization
Wealth concentration
Plantations
Social democratic concepts